Domain may refer to:

Film
Domain (2009 film), a French film
Domain (2016 film), an American film
The Domain (film), a 2019 Portuguese film

Information technology
 Administrative domain
 Broadcast domain, in computer networking, a group of special-purpose addresses to receive network announcements
 Collision domain
 Domain (software engineering), a field of study that defines a set of common requirements, terminology, and functionality for any software program constructed to solve a problem in a given field
 Application domain, a mechanism used within a Common Language Infrastructure to isolate executed software applications from one another
 Programming domain, a set of programming languages or programming environments that were engineered specifically for a particular domain (software engineering)
Network domain, a named grouping of hosts and servers with managed login, access to resources, and permissions.
Domain name, a label that identifies a realm of administrative autonomy, authority, or control within the Internet

Mathematics
Domain (mathematical analysis), an open connected set
Domain (ring theory), a nontrivial ring without left or right zero divisors
Integral domain, a non-trivial commutative ring without zero divisors
Atomic domain, an integral domain in which every non-zero non-unit is a finite product of irreducible elements
Bézout domain, an integral domain in which the sum of two principal ideals is again a principal ideal
Euclidean domain, an integral domain which allows a suitable generalization of the Euclidean algorithm
Dedekind domain, an integral domain in which every nonzero proper ideal factors into a product of prime ideals
GCD domain, an integral domain in which every two non-zero elements have a greatest common divisor
Principal ideal domain, an integral domain in which every ideal is principal
Unique factorization domain, an integral domain in which every non-zero element can be written as a product of irreducible elements in essentially a unique way
Domain of a function, the set of input values for which the (total) function is defined
Domain of definition of a partial function
Natural domain of a partial function
Domain of holomorphy of a function
 Domain of an algebraic structure, the set on which the algebraic structure is defined
Domain of discourse, the set of entities over which logic variables may range
Domain theory, the study of certain subsets of continuous lattices that provided the first denotational semantics of the lambda calculus
Frequency domain, the analysis of mathematical functions with respect to frequency, rather than time
Fundamental domain, subset of a space that contains exactly one point from each orbit of the action of a symmetry group
Time domain, the analysis of mathematical functions with respect to time

Music
"Domain", track by John Carpenter from Lost Themes
"Domain", a song by KSI from the 2020 album Dissimulation

Places
The Domain (Austin, Texas), a shopping mall in Austin, Texas, United States
Domain (Hong Kong shopping centre), a shopping mall in Yau Tong, Kowloon, Hong Kong
Domain, Manitoba, a hamlet in Manitoba, Canada
Domain Precinct, a part of South Yarra in Melbourne, Victoria, Australia

Australian public domains

The Domain, Sydney, a large open space near the central business district of Sydney
Kings Domain, Melbourne, Victoria
Queens Domain, Hobart, Tasmania

New Zealand public domains

Auckland Domain: a large inner-city park in Auckland
One Tree Hill Domain in Auckland
Mount Eden Domain in Auckland
Mount Smart Domain in Auckland
Mangere Domain in Mangere
Hamilton Lake Domain in Hamilton
Taumarunui Domain in Taumarunui
Ashburton Domain in Canterbury
Ocean Beach Domain in Dunedin

Science 
Domain (biology), a taxonomic subdivision larger than a kingdom
Domain of discourse, the collection of entities of interest in logical analysis
High-field domain (physics) in semiconductors, also called Böer domain
Knowledge domain, knowledge within a certain discipline, often formalized as a terminology
Magnetic domain (physics), a region within a magnetic material which has uniform magnetization
Protein domain (biology), a part of a protein that can exist independently of the rest of the protein chain
Social domain, a concept in sociology

Other uses 
Demesne, in English common law and other Medieval European contexts, lands directly managed by their holder rather than being delegated to subordinate managers
 Domain, or battlespace, a concept in military operations dividing operating environments into defined components
 Domain Group, an Australian real estate marketing portal, owner of the brand domain.com.au and others
Eminent domain, the right of a government to appropriate another person's property for public use
Private domain / Public domain, places defined under Jewish law where it is either permitted or forbidden to move objects on the Sabbath day 
Public domain, creative work to which no exclusive intellectual property rights apply
Territory (subdivision), a non-sovereign geographic area which has come under the authority of another government